Hossein Keyhani (born 26 April 1990 in Songhor, Kermanshah Province) is an Iranian Kurdish runner specializing in the 3000 metres steeplechase. He represented Iran at the 2017 World Championships but failed to reach the final despite setting a new national record of 8:33.76. Earlier that year he became an Asian Champion in the event. In 2018 he won the steeplechase at the Asian Games, setting new national and Asian Games records. In 2019 he was banned from competing for four years over a positive doping test for stamina-booster EPO.

International competitions

References

External links 

 

1990 births
Living people
Iranian male steeplechase runners
Asian Games gold medalists for Iran
Asian Games gold medalists in athletics (track and field)
Athletes (track and field) at the 2018 Asian Games
Medalists at the 2018 Asian Games
World Athletics Championships athletes for Iran
Asian Athletics Championships winners
Asian Indoor Athletics Championships winners
Iranian sportspeople in doping cases
Doping cases in athletics